"War is Hell" is a phrase usually attributed to American Civil War general William Tecumseh Sherman, and it may also refer to:

War Is Hell (comics), a 1973–1975 Marvel Comics series
War Is Hell (film), a 1961 American war film by Burt Topper, starring Audie Murphy
"War Is Hell (On the Homefront Too)", a 1982 song by T. G. Sheppard
War Is Hell, a 2004 album by the Warriors
"War Is Hell", a 2017 song by Ho99o9 from United States of Horror

See also
 "War Is the H-Word", a 2000 episode of Futurama